Abrothrix hershkovitzi, also known as Hershkovitz's grass mouse or Hershkovitz's akodont, is a species of rodent in the genus Abrothrix of family Cricetidae. It is found only on some remote islands in southern Chile. It is named after American zoologist Philip Hershkovitz.

References

Literature cited
Mittermeier, R.A. 1997. "Philip Hershkovitz - A Remembrance". Primate Info Net. Wisconsin Primate Research Center Library. Retrieved April 6, 2009.
Patterson, B. & D'elia, G. 2008. . In IUCN. IUCN Red List of Threatened Species. Version 2009.2. <www.iucnredlist.org>. Downloaded on January 12, 2010.

Abrothrix
Mammals of Chile
Mammals described in 1984
Taxonomy articles created by Polbot
Taxobox binomials not recognized by IUCN